Abu-Zaid al Kuwaiti (born Khalid Bin Abdul Rehman Al-Hussainan;  – December 6, 2012) was a high-ranking member of Al-Qaeda, and was considered a potential successor to Ayman al-Zawahiri, the head of the Salafist jihad group. Abu-Zaid was killed in a drone strike in Pakistan.

Biography 
Abu-Zaid al Kuwaiti was born in Kuwait in either 1965 or 1966. At one point, he was an imam in the Kuwait Ministry of Awqaf and Islamic Affairs. He became affiliated with the Al-Qaeda jihadist group and a member of their Islamic study committee, eventually joining the top tier of leaders. Since the death of Abu Yahya al Libi earlier in 2012, Abu-Zaid was regarded as Al Qaeda's top religious scholar, appearing in many videos teaching Islam.

Abu Zaid was considered a potential heir to the organization, and accordingly became a high-value target for the United States and Pakistani government. He was killed in a drone attack while eating breakfast (Suhur) near Mir Ali in Pakistan, and the Al-Qaeda organization acknowledged his death three months later. He was 46 years old when he was killed. NBC News journalist and United States Department of Justice consultant Evan Kohlmann commented on his death in an interview with NBC. “That's a big gap in the leadership. He was the last senior Al-Qaida leader in the Afghanistan-Pakistan area who was, one, from the Arabian Peninsula and, two, who had serious clerical credentials. Now there is no obvious publicly recognizable candidate left to succeed Zawahiri.”

Abu Zaid has been honored as martyr by al Qaeda, Ansar al-Sharia in Tunisia, and Seifallah Ben Hassine.

Notes

References 

1960s births
2012 deaths
Kuwaiti al-Qaeda members
Assassinated al-Qaeda leaders
20th-century criminals
21st-century criminals
Deaths by United States drone strikes in Pakistan
Kuwaiti expatriates in Pakistan